Assan Seck (born 1 January 2004) is a Senegalese professional footballer who plays for the Under-19 squad of the Italian club Empoli on loan from Pisa.

Club career 
Having started his career in Italy at Delfino Pescara, Assan Seck arrived in Pisa on the summer 2021, while he had also been announced as a signing for Fiorentina.

He made his professional debut for Pisa on 1 November 2021, coming on as a substitute in the 1–1 home Serie B draw against Ascoli.

In January 2022, he was loaned to Fiorentina, with a buyout clause, joining the club's Primavera side. On 18 August 2022, Seck was loaned to Empoli with an option to buy, again being assigned to the Primavera side.

References

External links

2004 births
Living people
Senegalese footballers
Association football forwards
Pisa S.C. players
Serie B players
Senegalese expatriate footballers
Expatriate footballers in Italy
Senegalese expatriate sportspeople in Italy